Ratupura is a village of Thakurdwara Tehsil, Moradabad District, Uttar Pradesh, India.

Geography
This village is situated on Thakurdwara-Kanth Highway. It is located at 8 KM distance from Thakurdwara, 20 KM distance from Kashipur, 24 KM distance from Kanth, 42 KM from Moradabad, 210 KM from National Capital New Delhi, 389 KM from Uttar Pradesh's capital Lucknow. Nearest Railway Station is Kashipur Junction, Uttarakhand(20 km).

Demographics
As of 2011 India census, Ratupura had a population of 8,305. Males constitute 52.4% of the population and females 47.6%. Ratupura has an average literacy rate of 57.3%, lower than the national average of 59.5%: male literacy is 66.4%, and female literacy is 47.3%. In Ratupura 13.7% of the population is under 6 years of age.

References 

Villages in Moradabad district